The 2017 Pan American Weightlifting Championships was held in Miami, United States between July 23 and July 30, 2017.

A total of 126 weightlifters qualified to compete at the 2019 Pan American Games through scores from both the 2017 and 2018 Pan American Championships combined. A nation may enter a maximum of 12 weightlifters (six per gender). The host nation (Peru) automatically qualified the maximum team size.

Medal summary
Results are obtained from the IWF website.

Men

 Fernando Reis participated as an extra athlete and his results did not count for the competition. He lifted 198 kg in Snatch for a Pan American record. He also lifted 225 kg for Clean & Jerk and a Total of 423 kg

Women

Medal table

References

Pan American Weightlifting Championships
Pan American Weightlifting Championships
Pan American Weightlifting Championships
International sports competitions hosted by the United States
Weightlifting in the United States
Qualification tournaments for the 2019 Pan American Games